Punctum blandianum is a species of minute air-breathing land snail, a terrestrial pulmonate gastropod mollusk in the family Punctidae, the dot snails.

Shell description
The shell of P. blandianum is between 1.1 and 1.3 mm wide.  The outer shell surface has a sculpture of radial striae, which are obvious under magnification.   The umbilicus is about one third the width of the shell.

Distribution
This species is found in the United States, in the states of Tennessee, Virginia and Alabama.

Habitat
Population sizes ofPunctum blandianum have been observed to be five times larger on highly acidic sites than on basic sites.

References

Punctidae
Gastropods described in 1900